Jahangir Khan (born 1963) is a Pakistani squash player.

Jahangir Khan may also refer to:
 Jahangir Khan (cricketer) (1910–1988), played cricket for India during British rule
 Jahangir Khan (footballer) (born 2000), Pakistani football midfielder
 Jahangir Alam Khan (born 1952), Bangladeshi agricultural economist and researcher
 Mirza Jahangir Khan (1875–1908), Iranian journalist and politician

See also
 Jahangir (name)
 Cihangir (disambiguation)